ExtraMile Arena (formerly BSU Pavilion and Taco Bell Arena) is a multi-purpose indoor arena in the western United States, on the campus of Boise State University in Boise, Idaho. It is located on the east end of campus, between West Campus Lane and César Chávez Circle, immediately northwest of Albertsons Stadium.

Home to the Broncos basketball and gymnastics teams, its current seating capacity is 12,644 for basketball.

The venue is also used for concerts (capacity 13,390), community events, and trade shows ( of arena floor space plus  in the auxiliary gym). It hosted a Davis Cup tennis match in April 2013, a second-round tie between the U.S. and Serbia.

Bronco Gym
The arena's predecessor on campus was Bronco Gymnasium, which opened in the mid-1950s, during the junior college era. Its last varsity basketball game was the regular season finale in 1982 on February 27, against rival Idaho, ranked ninth in the AP poll. Sold out two weeks in advance, the Saturday night game had a record attendance of 3,946; the capacity of the gym at the time was listed at 3,682.

History
Long in the planning stages, the architects were Cline, Smull, Hamill and Associates of Boise, selected in October 1978. Ground was broken for the arena in February 1980, directly north of the Bronco Gym. Construction displaced the tennis courts and the right field area of the baseball field, currently the site of the auxiliary gym on the west side of the arena.

Eight tennis courts were rebuilt on the former baseball infield, west of the arena.

The arena opened  in 1982 as the BSU Pavilion; its first event was commencement on May 16, followed by graduation ceremonies for the city's three public high schools. That August, it hosted an eight-day Billy Graham Crusade, and its first significant sporting event was the NCAA basketball tournament in March 1983.

In April 2017, Boise State ended their wrestling program, which had been using the arena as its home venue.

Naming rights
The BSU Pavilion received its first naming rights sponsorship in June 2004 with Taco Bell, a fast-food restaurant chain based in Irvine, California; the 15-year agreement with the university was for $4 million and the venue was renamed Taco Bell Arena. At its expiration in 2019, Boise State entered into a new agreement with ExtraMile, a convenience store chain jointly owned by Chevron and Jacksons; the 15-year agreement was for $8.4 million and it became ExtraMile Arena.

Basketball tournaments

While the Broncos were members, the venue hosted four Big Sky Conference men's basketball tournaments: 1985, 1989, 1990, and 1994. In those four tourneys, BSU made the finals in 1989 and won the title in 1994.

ExtraMile Arena has been a familiar site for early-round NCAA tournament games, hosting first and second round competition nine times (1983, 1989, 1992, 1995, 1998, 2001, 2005, 2009, and 2018). It had been scheduled to return in 2021, but the COVID-19 pandemic resulted in the entire tournament getting moved to Indiana.

In 1995, UCLA guard Tyus Edney dashed the length of the  court in just over four seconds to make a layup that gave the Bruins a 75–74 win over Missouri, which sustained UCLA's run to the national title.

In 2001, it was the site of the closest first-round day at a single host location, with the four games on March 15 decided by a combined total of seven points. One was Hampton's 58–57 upset of #2 seed Iowa State — only the fourth #15 seed to advance since the tournament expanded from 53 to 64 teams in 1985.

See also
 List of NCAA Division I basketball arenas

References

External links
 
 Historical aerial photographs via Boise State Digital Collections

College basketball venues in the United States
College gymnastics venues in the United States
College wrestling venues in the United States
Boise State Broncos men's basketball
Boise State Broncos women's basketball
Basketball venues in Idaho
Convention centers in Idaho
Buildings and structures in Boise, Idaho
Tourist attractions in Boise, Idaho
Sports venues completed in 1982
1982 establishments in Idaho